This is a list of main career statistics of American professional tennis player Taylor Fritz. All statistics are according to the ATP Tour and ITF website.

Singles performance timeline

Current through the 2023 BNP Paribas Open.

Significant finals

Masters 1000 finals

Singles: 1 (1 title)

ATP career finals

Singles: 10 (5 titles, 5 runner-ups)

Doubles: 2 (2 runner-ups)

National and international representation

Team competitions finals: 3 (2 titles, 1 runner-up)

Challenger and Futures finals

Singles: 8 (5–3)

Doubles: 1 (0–1)

Junior Grand Slam finals

Singles: 2 (1 title, 1 runner-up)

Record against other players

Record against top-10 players

Fritz's record against those who have been ranked in the top 10, with active players in boldface:

Wins over top 10 players
Fritz has a  record against players who were, at the time the match was played, ranked in the top 10.

*

See also 

 United States Davis Cup team
 List of United States Davis Cup team representatives

Notes

References

External links
 
 
 

Fritz, Taylor